The 2014 United States House of Representatives elections in Utah were held on November 4, 2014 to elect the four U.S. representatives from Utah, one from each of the state's four congressional districts. Representatives are elected for two-year terms; those elected will serve in the 114th Congress from January 2015 until January 2017.

Overview

By district
Results of the 2014 United States House of Representatives elections in Utah by district:

District 1

The 1st district is located in northern Utah and includes the cities of Ogden and Logan, as well as the northern half of the Great Salt Lake. The incumbent is Republican Rob Bishop, who has represented the district since 2003. He was re-elected with 72% of the vote in 2012 and the district has a PVI of R+27.

Republican nomination
Bishop was challenged in the Republican primary by David Yu-Lin Chiu. At the Republican State Convention on April 26, 2014, Bishop received 81% of the vote to Chiu's 19%, winning the nomination without the need for a primary.

Democratic nomination
Former U.S. Army Second Lieutenant, businesswoman and nominee for the seat in 2012 Donna McAleer ran again for the Democrats. Physician Peter Clemens also ran. At the Democratic State Convention, also held on April 26, 2014, McAleer received 58.9% to Clemens' 40.1%, just 2 votes short of the 60% needed to avoid a primary election, with 4 delegates abstaining. On the second ballot, she received 75% to Clemens' 25% and was nominated.

General election
Libertarian Craig Bowden and Independent American Dwayne A. Vance are also on the ballot.

Polling

Results

District 2

The 2nd district is located in western and southern Utah and includes largely rural parts of the state as well as the state capital Salt Lake City and the cities of St. George and Tooele. The incumbent is Republican Chris Stewart, who has represented the district since 2013. He was elected with 62% of the vote in 2012, succeeding Democrat Jim Matheson, who ran in the newly created 4th district. The district has a PVI of R+18.

Republican nomination
Stewart was challenged in the Republican primary by Zachary A. Hartman, Vaughn Hatton and attorney Larry Meyers. At the Republican State Convention on April 26, 2014, Stewart received 68% of the vote, winning the nomination without the need for a primary. Meyers took 22%, Hatton took 6% and Hartman took 5%.

Democratic nomination
State Senator Luz Robles is running for the Democrats. At the Democratic State Convention, also held on April 26, 2014, she was nominated by acclamation.

General election
Also on the ballot are Shaun McCausland of the Constitution Party, Independent American Wayne L. Hill and Independent Bill Barron. Independent Warren Rogers is running as a write-in candidate.

Polling

Results

District 3

The 3rd district is located in southern and eastern Utah and includes the cities of Orem and Provo. The incumbent is Republican Jason Chaffetz, who has represented the district since 2009. He was re-elected with 77% of the vote in 2012 and the district has a PVI of R+28.

Republican nomination
Chaffetz was challenged in the Republican primary by Mark Hedengren and Robert J. Stevens. At the Republican State Convention on April 26, 2014, Chaffetz received 87% of the vote, winning the nomination without the need for a primary. Hedengren and Stevens each took 6% of the vote.

Democratic nomination
Software engineer Brian Wonnacott is running for the Democrats. He had planned to run as an Independent, but changed his mind shortly before the filing deadline when he saw that no-one had filed to run as a Democrat. At the Democratic State Convention, also held on April 26, 2014, he was nominated by acclamation.

General election
Independent American Zack Strong defeated Abraham for his party's nomination. Independents Ben J. Mates and Stephen P. Tyron are also on the ballot. David Else, 2nd Vice-Chair and Southern Regional Coordinator of the Independent American Party is running as an Independent write-in candidate.

Polling

Results

District 4

The 4th district is located in northern-central Utah and includes parts of Salt Lake, Utah, Juab, and Sanpete counties. The incumbent is Democrat Jim Matheson, who has represented the district since 2013 and previously represented the 3rd district from 2001 to 2013. He was re-elected with 49% of the vote in 2012 and the district has a PVI of R+16.

Democratic nomination
On December 17, 2013, Matheson announced he would not seek re-election. Fellow moderate Democrat Doug Owens, an attorney and son of the late Congressman Wayne Owens, and engineer and candidate for the U.S. Senate in 2012 Bill Peterson ran for their party's nomination. At the Democratic State Convention on April 26, 2014, Owens received 98% of the vote to Peterson's 2% and was nominated.

Republican nomination
Republican Mia Love, the former Mayor of Saratoga Springs, who lost to Matheson by 768 votes in 2012, is running again. She was challenged for the Republican nomination by businessman, former Director of Utah's Office of Business and Economic Development and candidate for the seat in 2012 Bob Fuehr. Investment fund manager and Utah State Board of Education member Jennifer Johnson had been running, but withdrew from the race in April 2014. At the Republican nominating convention, also on April 26, 2014, Love received 78% of the vote to 22% for Fuehr, and was thus nominated without the need for a primary.

General election
Also on the ballot are Collin Robert Simonsen of the Constitution Party, Independent American Party Tim Aalders and Libertarian Jim L. Vein.

Polling

Results

See also
 2014 United States House of Representatives elections
 2014 United States elections

References

External links
U.S. House elections in Utah, 2014 at Ballotpedia
Campaign contributions at OpenSecrets

Utah
2014
United States House of Representatives